Sandy Amerio (born October 4, 1973) is a film director, visual artist, researcher and writer.

Biography
Sandy Amerio studied video at the école supérieure des beaux-arts de Nantes Métropole (1996 to 1999) and film directing at Le Fresnoy-Studio National des Arts Contemporains (2000 to 2002).

In her first movie Surfing on (our) History (2000), Amerio confronted her family with its own image. The film developed contemporary drama themes such as a loss of grip on History. Amerio "gives a very clever answer to the question often asked in the documentary: is my life a novel?"

Her second movie Waiting Time /Romania (2001) also features non-actors playing themselves, this time in Romania.

In 2004 Amerio introduced a business storytelling concept in France with her film Hear me, children-yet-to-be-born (2004) featuring Nancye Ferguson, James C.Burns (and Black Sifichi as voice-over) in a Death Valley corporate tale. In this movie, a manager tells to an assembly a story that arrived to him during his last business trip to the Dead Sea with the aim of laying off the employees who listen to him. The same year, she wrote her first book on business storytelling including texts of considered American storytellers like Rosabeth Moss Kanter, Doug Stevenson and Diana Hartley.

Between 2008 and 2010 she worked with the French writer Patrick Bouvet on the reading/audiovisual performance Wandering Souls. Mixing poetical texts, graphic works and music, Amerio and Bouvet revisited how the United States constructed interior and exterior enemies, browsing through history, from the Second World War to the present day, from horror films to amateur videos.

Amerio also works on stage, performing her own texts accompanied by the experimental musician Jean-Marc Montera (Director of the GRIM in Marseille). An album called L'Hôtesse was released in 2011.

Between 2010 and 2012 Amerio investigated reality and fiction concepts initiating the Restage Replay Reload creation process, with the Japanese world war two reenactor Hiroki Nakazato. She directed and edited the movie DRAGOONED, a documentary on hard core reenactment practice, presented at the 63rd Berlin International Film Festival (Forum Expanded).

Art work
Sandy Amerio's main medium is film, although she also practices writing and photography. "Her research relates to the signs emitted by our contemporary societies." With an anthropological approach and through narratives, "she focuses on elements of reality, which she questions, by inventing protocols that enable distanciation, creating aesthetic, theoretical, and poetic connections."

References

External links

 Sandy Amerio Official Website

1973 births
Living people
French video artists
20th-century French women artists
21st-century French women artists
French women film directors